Dzerzhinsk, transliterated from Russian, may be the name of one of the following places.

Dzerzhinsk, Russia
Dzyarzhynsk, Belarus
Dzerzhynsk, former name of Toretsk, Ukraine

See also
Dzerzhynsk (disambiguation)
Dzerzhinsky (disambiguation)